Alexander Raleigh Hobbs (April 5, 1852 – October 15, 1929) was an American lawyer and Democratic politician who served as a member of the Virginia Senate and House of Delegates.

References

External links

1852 births
1929 deaths
Democratic Party members of the Virginia House of Delegates
Democratic Party Virginia state senators
Virginia Tech alumni
People from Prince George County, Virginia
20th-century American politicians